Brachycentridae is a family of humpless casemaker caddisflies in the order Trichoptera. It is found in North America, Europe, and Asia. Georg Ulmer first described it in Germany in 1903 as a subfamily of Sericostomatidae. The type genus for Brachycentridae is Brachycentrus J. Curtis, 1834.

Distribution
The family Brachycentridae contains at least 100 species in about 8 genera. The genera Adicrophelps and Amiocentrus are found near the Arctic circle. Doliocentrus and Eorbachycentrus are found in southeastern Siberia and Japan and Western North America respectively.

Larvae
Most species' larvae make cases using plant or rock material. Several others make it out of silk. A few species' larvae in Brachycentrus form cases in the water with hairs sticking out to absorb food from the water.

Genera
These eight genera belong to the family Brachycentridae:
 Adicrophleps Flint, 1965 i c g b
 Amiocentrus Ross, 1938 i c g b
 Baissoplectrum Ivanov, 2006 g
 Brachycentrus Curtis, 1834 i c g b
 Dolichocentrus Martynov, 1935 i c g
 Eobrachycentrus Wiggins, 1965 i c g
 Hummeliella Forsslund, 1936 i c g
 Micrasema McLachlan, 1876 i c g b
Data sources: i = ITIS, c = Catalogue of Life, g = GBIF, b = Bugguide.net

References

Bibliography

 Ulmer, G. (1903) Ueber die Metamorphose der Trichopteren. Hamburg, Germany: Abhandlungen des Naturwissenschaftlichen.
 Wiggins, G. B. (2004) Caddisflies: the underwater architects. Toronto: University of Toronto Press.

 

Trichoptera families